Poland participated in the Eurovision Song Contest 2008 with the song "For Life" written and performed by Isis Gee. The Polish broadcaster Telewizja Polska (TVP) organised the national final Piosenka dla Europy 2008 in order to select the Polish entry for the 2008 contest in Belgrade, Serbia. The national final took place on 23 February 2008 and featured twelve entries. "For Life" performed by Isis Gee was selected as the winner after gaining the most points following the combination of votes from a four-member jury panel and a public vote.

Poland was drawn to compete in the first semi-final of the Eurovision Song Contest which took place on 20 May 2008. Performing during the show in position 10, "For Life" was announced among the top 10 entries of the second semi-final and therefore qualified to compete in the final on 14 May. This marked the first time that Poland qualified to the final of the Eurovision Song Contest from a semi-final since the introduction of semi-finals in 2004. It was later revealed that Poland placed tenth out of the 19 participating countries in the semi-final with 42 points. In the final, Poland performed in position 10 and placed twenty-fourth out of the 25 participating countries, scoring 14 points.

Background 
Prior to the 2008 Contest, Poland had participated in the Eurovision Song Contest twelve times since its first entry in 1994. Poland's highest placement in the contest, to this point, has been second place, which the nation achieved with its debut entry in 1994 with the song "To nie ja!" performed by Edyta Górniak. Poland has only, thus far, reached the top ten on one other occasion, when Ich Troje performing the song "Keine Grenzen – Żadnych granic" finished seventh in 2003. Between 2005 and 2006, Poland failed to qualify from the semi-final round, once again failing to qualify to the final in 2007 with their entry "Time to Party" performed by the Jet Set.

The Polish national broadcaster, Telewizja Polska (TVP), broadcasts the event within Poland and organises the selection process for the nation's entry. TVP confirmed Poland's participation in the 2008 Eurovision Song Contest on 8 November 2007. Since 2006, TVP organised televised national finals that featured a competition among several artists and songs in order to select the Polish entry for the Eurovision Song Contest, a selection procedure that continued for their 2008 entry.

Before Eurovision

Piosenka dla Europy 2008 
Piosenka dla Europy 2008 was the national final organised by TVP in order to select the Polish entry for the Eurovision Song Contest 2008. The show took place on 23 February 2008 at the Studio 5 of TVP in Warsaw, hosted by Katarzyna Sowińska and Radosław Brzózka. A combination of public televoting and jury voting selected the winner. The show was broadcast on TVP1 and TVP Polonia as well as streamed online at the broadcaster's website tvp.pl. The national final was watched by 2.7 million viewers in Poland with a market share of 26%.

Competing entries 
TVP opened a submission period for interested artists and songwriters to submit their entries between 30 November 2007 and 2 January 2008. Only artists that had either released an album or single with national radio airplays, had competed in at least one professional song contest or music festival at a national level, or had a valid contract with a record company or a professional concert agency were eligible to compete. The broadcaster received 100 submissions at the closing of the deadline. A nine-member selection committee selected ten entries from the received submissions to compete in the national final, while TVP selected an additional three entries to compete as wildcards. The selection committee consisted of Piotr Klatt (musician, songwriter, journalist and music producer at TVP and artistic director of the Opole Festival), Paweł Sztompkę (journalist, music critic and editorial director of music at Polish Radio), Artur Orzech (Eurovision commentator, radio and television journalist and presenter), Magda Czapińska (songwriter), Zuzanna Łapicka (Head of Entertainment of TVP1), Agata Krysiak (editor at the Polish Society of the Phonographic Industry), Ryszard Poznakowski (singer and composer), Robert Obcowski (composer and producer) and Tomasz Deszczyński (President of OGAE Poland). The selected entries were announced on 7 January 2008, while the wildcards were announced between 8 February 2008. Among the competing artists was Sandra Oxenryd, who represented Estonia in the Eurovision Song Contest in 2006. On 11 January, "Kiełbasa", written and to have been performed by Krzysztof Zalewski, was disqualified from the national final as the song had been released before 1 October 2007 and replaced with the song "Do Something" performed by Plastic. On 15 February, "Noc kupaly", written by Robert Wasilewski and to have been performed by Zywiolak, was disqualified from the national final as the song had been performed before 1 October 2007. The competing artists were required to submit a promotional video for their song to TVP by 28 January 2008.

Final 
The televised final took place on 23 February 2008. Twelve entries competed and the winner, "For Life" performed by Isis Gee, was determined by a 50/50 combination of votes from a four-member professional jury and a public vote. The jury consisted of Maryla Rodowicz (singer), Janusz Kosiński (journalist), Paweł Sztompke (journalist, music critic and editorial director of music at Polish Radio) and Adrian Stanisławski (member of OGAE Poland). In addition to the performances of the competing entries, singer Natalia Kukulska opened the show with her song "Sexy Flexi", while Kukulska and singers Bartosz Królik, In-Grid and Stachursky performed as the interval acts.

Promotion 
Isis Gee made several appearances across Europe to specifically promote "For Life" as the Polish Eurovision entry. On 2 March, Isis Gee performed during the presentation show of the 2008 Bosnian Eurovision entry, BH Eurosong 2008. On 25 April, Gee performed during the UK Eurovision Eurovision Party, which was held at the Scala Club in London, United Kingdom. Isis Gee completed promotional activities in Ireland where she performed during the RTÉ One talk show The Late Late Show on 6 May.

At Eurovision
It was announced in September 2007 that the competition's format would be expanded to two semi-finals in 2008. According to the rules, all nations with the exceptions of the host country and the "Big Four" (France, Germany, Spain and the United Kingdom) are required to qualify from one of two semi-finals in order to compete for the final; the top nine songs from each semi-final as determined by televoting progress to the final, and a tenth was determined by back-up juries. The European Broadcasting Union (EBU) split up the competing countries into six different pots based on voting patterns from previous contests, with countries with favourable voting histories put into the same pot. On 28 January 2008, a special allocation draw was held which placed each country into one of the two semi-finals. Poland was placed into the first semi-final, to be held on 20 May 2008. The running order for the semi-finals was decided through another draw on 17 March 2008 and Poland was set to perform in position 10, following the entry from Norway and before the entry from Ireland.

The two semi-finals and the final were broadcast in Poland on TVP1 and TVP Polonia with commentary by Artur Orzech. The Polish spokesperson, who announced the Polish votes during the final, was Radek Brzózka.

Semi-final 

Isis Gee took part in technical rehearsals on 12 and 15 May, followed by dress rehearsals on 19 and 20 May. The Polish performance featured Isis Gee performing in a long light blue dress flanked by a pianist on one side of the stage and four violinists on the other. The stage LED screens displayed white and light blue colours with the performance also featuring smoke effects. The musicians that joined Gee on stage were: Adam Gołębiowski (pianist), Beata Lapuk (violinist), Jona Ardyn (violinist), Małgorzata Liberska (violinist) and Patrycja Kawecka (violinist).

At the end of the show, Poland was announced as having finished among the ten qualifying countries and subsequently qualifying for the grand final. This marked the first time that Poland qualified to the final of the Eurovision Song Contest from a semi-final since the introduction of semi-finals in 2004. It was later revealed that Poland placed tenth in the semi-final, receiving a total of 42 points.

Final 
The draw for the running order for the final was done by the presenters during the announcement of the ten qualifying countries during the semi-final and Poland was drawn to perform in position 10, following the entry from Croatia and before the entry from Iceland. Isis Gee once again took part in dress rehearsals on 23 and 24 May before the final and Gee performed a repeat of her semi-final performance during the final on 24 May. Poland placed twenty-fourth in the final, scoring 14 points.

Voting 
Below is a breakdown of points awarded to Poland and awarded by Poland in the first semi-final and grand final of the contest. The nation awarded its 12 points to Armenia in the semi-final and the final of the contest.

Points awarded to Poland

Points awarded by Poland

References

2008
Countries in the Eurovision Song Contest 2008
Eurovision
Eurovision